Nuneaton Academy (formerly Alderman Smith School) is a coeducational secondary school with academy status located in Nuneaton, Warwickshire, England.

Originally known as Alderman Smith School, the school was formally closed in 2011 and reopened the next day as Nuneaton Academy, with largely the same pupils and staff. The Nuneaton Academy is part of a trust called the Midlands Academy Trust with Hartshill Academy, George Elliot Academy and Heath Lane Academy.

References

External links
The Nuneaton Academy official website

Nuneaton
Secondary schools in Warwickshire
Academies in Warwickshire